Tor Einar Hielm is a former international speedway rider from Norway.

Speedway career 
Hielm is a champion of Norway, winning the Norwegian Championship in 1987.

Hielm reached the final of the Speedway World Pairs Championship in the 1991 Speedway World Pairs Championship winning a bronze medal.

World Final appearances
 1991 -  Poznań, Olimpia Poznań Stadium (with Lars Gunnestad / Einar Kyllingstad) - 3rd - 19pts

References 

Norwegian speedway riders
Living people
Year of birth missing (living people)